Gary J. Keller (born June 13, 1944) is an American former college and professional basketball player who was a center and power forward in the American Basketball Association (ABA) for two seasons during the late 1960s.  Keller played college basketball for the University of Florida, and thereafter, he played professionally for the Minnesota Muskies and the Miami Floridians of the ABA.

Early years 

Keller was born in Elizabeth, New Jersey in 1944.  He grew up in St. Petersburg, Florida, where he attended Dixie M. Hollins High School.  He played high school basketball for the Dixie Hollins Rebels, winning back-to-back Florida state championships in 1961 and 1962.  He was a McDonald's fourth-team high school All-American selection as a senior.

College career 

Keller accepted an athletic scholarship to attend the University of Florida in Gainesville, Florida, and played for coach Norm Sloan and coach Tommy Bartlett's Florida Gators men's basketball teams from 1964 to 1967.  The Gators finished 21–4 in 1967—their best-ever win-loss record up to that time.  Keller was an Academic All-American, and graduated from Florida with a bachelor's degree in business administration in 1967.  He was later inducted into the University of Florida Athletic Hall of Fame as a "Gator Great," and was recognized as an SEC Basketball Legend in 2003.

Professional career 

After his college career, Keller was drafted in the sixth round of the 1967 National Basketball Association (NBA) Draft by the Los Angeles Lakers, and by the Denver Nuggets in the 1967 ABA Draft.  After the Nuggets traded him to the Minnesota Muskies, he chose to play for the Minnesota ABA franchise instead of the NBA.  Keller averaged 6.0 points and 4.5 rebounds per game during his two ABA seasons.

Life after basketball 

Keller is married, and he and his wife Barbara live in St. Petersburg, Florida.  They have a son and a daughter.

See also 

 Florida Gators
 List of University of Florida alumni
 List of University of Florida Athletic Hall of Fame members

References 

1944 births
Living people
American men's basketball players
Basketball players from St. Petersburg, Florida
Basketball players from New Jersey
Centers (basketball)
Florida Gators men's basketball players
Los Angeles Lakers draft picks
Miami Floridians players
Minnesota Muskies players
Parade High School All-Americans (boys' basketball)
Power forwards (basketball)
Sportspeople from Elizabeth, New Jersey
Dixie Hollins High School alumni